Gillingham Grammar School may refer to:

Gillingham Grammar School, Dorset in Gillingham, Dorset
Gillingham Grammar School, Kent in Gillingham, Kent